This list of historical markers installed by the National Historical Commission of the Philippines (NHCP) in Eastern Visayas (Region VIII) is an annotated list of people, places, or events in the region that have been commemorated by cast-iron plaques issued by the said commission. The plaques themselves are permanent signs installed in publicly visible locations on buildings, monuments, or in special locations.

While many Cultural Properties have historical markers installed, not all places marked with historical markers are designated into one of the particular categories of Cultural Properties.

This article lists fifty (50) markers from the Eastern Visayas Region.

Biliran
This article lists one (1) marker from the Province of Biliran.

Leyte
This article lists twenty (20) markers from the Province of Leyte.

Eastern Samar
This article lists twelve (13) markers from the Province of Eastern Samar.

Northern Samar
This article lists seven (7) markers from the Province of Northern Samar.

Samar
This article lists two (2) markers from the Province of Samar.

Southern Leyte
This article lists seven (7) markers from the Province of Southern Leyte.

See also
 List of Cultural Properties of the Philippines in Eastern Visayas

References

Footnotes

Bibliography 
 
 
 A list of sites and structures with historical markers, as of 16 January 2012
 A list of institutions with historical markers, as of 16 January 2012

External links
 A list of sites and structures with historical markers, as of 16 January 2012
 A list of institutions with historical markers, as of 16 January 2012
 National Registry of Historic Sites and Structures in the Philippines
 Policies on the Installation of Historical Markers

Eastern Visayas
Eastern Visayas